Rohmann is a surname. Notable people with the surname include:

Chris Rohmann, the former host of As Schools Match Wits on WGBY-TV channel 57 in Springfield, Massachusetts
Eric Rohmann (born 1957), American writer and illustrator of children's books from Chicago
Henrik Rohmann (1910–1978), Hungarian harpist and harp teacher
Nico Rohmann (born 1952), Luxembourger former footballer
Teresa Rohmann (born 1987), medley swimmer from Germany

See also
Rohrmann
Rothmann